Al-Shabab Al-Souri Al-Thaer is an opposition group in the Syrian Civil War. It is a coalition made up of Christian, Druze and Alawite minorities who oppose the Syrian government but also oppose Islamism, and which is committed to peaceful protests and activism. The Syrian government has reportedly been engaging in mass arrests of its members.

References

Organizations of the Syrian civil war